The Do Peixe River is a river of São Paulo state in southeastern Brazil. It is a tributary of the Tietê River.

See also
 List of rivers of São Paulo

References
 Brazilian Ministry of Transport

Rivers of São Paulo (state)